"If I'm Lyin, I'm Flyin" is a song by American rapper Kodak Black. It was released on September 28, 2018 as the lead single from his second studio album Dying to Live (2018).

Composition
The song finds Kodak Black rapping about his life from being on the streets and in jail to becoming a successful rapper ("I can't let these niggas knock me off my pimpin' / God sat me down and talked to me I listened"), and "ruminates on his fallen homies" as well.

Critical reception
Patrick Montes of Hypebeast wrote that the song "pairs his unique, charismatic flows with syrupy, bass-heavy melodies."

Music video
An accompanying music video was released with the single. Directed by Spencer Hord, the video shows Kodak Black enjoying his freedom after his release from jail, flying on a private jet and reuniting with family.

Charts

References

2018 singles
2018 songs
Kodak Black songs
Songs written by Kodak Black
Atlantic Records singles